Betsy Nagelsen and Gabriela Sabatini were the defending champions, but chose not to participate.

Larisa Savchenko-Neiland and Natalia Zvereva won the title, defeating Claudia Kohde-Kilsch and Helena Suková in the finals, 1–6, 7–5, 6–2.

Seeds 
The top four seeds received a bye to the second round.

Draw

Finals

Top half

Bottom half

References

External links 
 ITF tournament edition details

1991 WTA Tour
Ameritech Cup
Virginia Slims of Chicago